Ahmad Jamal's Alhambra is a live album by American jazz pianist Ahmad Jamal, featuring performances recorded at Jamal's own club in Chicago in 1961 and released on the Argo label.

Critical reception 
Allmusic awarded the album 4 stars, stating: "The interplay between the musicians was often magical."

Track listing 
 "We Kiss in a Shadow" (Richard Rodgers, Oscar Hammerstein II) – 4:47   
 "Sweet and Lovely" (Gus Arnheim, Harry Tobias, Jules LeMare) – 3:53   
 "The Party's Over" (Adolph Green, Betty Comden, Jule Styne) – 3:55   
 "Love for Sale" (Cole Porter) – 4:00   
 "Snow Fall" (Claude Thornhill) – 2:23   
 "Broadway" (Billy Byrd, Teddy McRae, Henri Woode) – 7:35   
 "Willow Weep for Me" (Ann Ronell) – 3:55   
 "Autumn Leaves" (Joseph Kosma, Jacques Prévert) – 3:45   
 "Isn't It Romantic" (Rodgers, Lorenz Hart) – 4:15   
 "The Breeze and I" (Ernesto Lecuona, Al Stillman) – 2:53

Personnel

Performance 
Ahmad Jamal – piano
Israel Crosby – bass
Vernel Fournier – drums

Production 
Leonard Chess – supervision
Ron Malo – engineer
Don Bronstein – cover art
Sid McCoy – liner notes

References 

Ahmad Jamal live albums
1961 live albums
Albums produced by Leonard Chess
Argo Records live albums